Greensleeves Records & Publishing, shortened to Greensleeves Records, is a record label specializing in dancehall and reggae music.  The company was founded by Chris Cracknell and Chris Sedgwick. Based in Britain, Greensleeves Records started as a small record store in West Ealing, London, in November 1975. The record label was founded in 1977, with early releases including albums by Augustus Pablo and Barrington Levy.

They have released records by Red Rat, Anthony Johnson, Barrington Levy, Billy Boyo, Chezidek, Dennis Brown, Dr Alimantado, Eek-A-Mouse, Elephant Man, Freddie McGregor, Gregory Isaacs, Keith Hudson, Mad Cobra, Scientist, Shabba Ranks, Sizzla, Vybz Kartel and Yellowman, and have had crossover pop hits with Tippa Irie's "Hello, Darling", Shaggy's "Oh Carolina", Beenie Man's "Who Am I (Sim Simma)" and Mr Vegas's "Head High." In 2002, Greensleeves released the popular Diwali album, which launched a global resurgence in dancehall reggae music. The album contained the global hits "No Letting Go" by Wayne Wonder and "Get Busy" by Sean Paul. The riddim (slightly altered) was also used by Lumidee on the hit "Never Leave You (Uh Oooh, Uh Oooh)". The label has a catalogue of close to 500 albums.

Greensleeves Publishing has the largest catalogue of reggae songs in the world, including the copyrights of Shaggy's "Oh Carolina", Sean Paul's "Get Busy", and "Break It Off" among over 20,000 copyrights.

The company was bought by Zest Inc. in 2006, and in 2008 was bought by VP Records.

References

External links

British record labels
Reggae record labels
Record labels established in 1975
IFPI members